Girls Aloud: Home Truths is a fly on the wall style documentary film that was broadcast as a prelude to the group's first full-length documentary series, Girls Aloud: Off the Record. The programme was first broadcast on 12 October 2005 on ITV2.

Content
Filming took place from March to September 2005. The documentary features the group discussing the success and impact of Girls Aloud so far, spending time with family and friends at home, performances and backstage footage from their What Will the Neighbours Say? Live tour, behind the scenes filming the music video for "Long Hot Summer", recording their third studio album, Chemistry.

The show pulled in nearly 267,000 viewers, which was a 1.6% share of the audience for that night.

References

External links

2005 television specials
Girls Aloud television shows
ITV (TV network) original programming
British television documentaries
2005 films
2000s English-language films
2000s British films